Barbara Teller Ornelas (born November 26, 1954) (Navajo people|Navajo) is an American weaver in Navajo traditions and techniques. She also is an instructor and author about this art. She has served overseas as a cultural ambassador for the U.S. State Department. A fifth-generation Navajo weaver, she exhibits her fine art textiles and traditions at home and abroad.

Ancestry
Ornelas was born for the Tabaaha and To-heedliinii clans (in English, Edgewater Clan and The Water Flows Together Clan) of the Navajo. She grew up at Two Grey Hills Trading Post in New Mexico, before later moving to Arizona. Learning from her mother, grandmothers and older sister, she is a fifth-generation Navajo weaver.

Art process
Her tapestries are woven from sheep wool that comes from Navajo family-raised sheep. She makes high weft-count weaves, including some that are from 102 to 140 wefts.

Art exhibitions
Her work has been featured at the Heard Museum, Arizona State Museum, Denver Art Museum, the National Museum of the American Indian, the Smithsonian Institution, and the British Museum of Mankind in London, among other museums.

Awards
 The Conrad House Award
 Best of Show (2 times) at the Santa Fe Indian Market

Cultural ambassador
Ornelas has traveled extensively as a cultural ambassador for the U.S. State Department. She has been a part of cultural programs in Uzbekistan, Kyrgyzstan, and Peru.

Books
She co-authored the following books with her sister Lynda Teller Pete:
 Spider Woman's Children: Navajo Weavers Today (2018) Thrums Books 
 How To Weave a Navajo Rug and Other Lessons from Spider Woman (2020), Thrums Books

Personal life
Her adult children Sierra Teller Ornelas and Micheal Teller Ornelas are sixth-generation Navajo weavers.

See also
 Craft in America

References

External links
 Navajo Rug Weavers website

1954 births
20th-century American women artists
21st-century American women artists
20th-century Native American women
20th-century Native Americans
21st-century Native American women
21st-century Native Americans
Navajo artists
Navajo people
Living people
21st-century American women writers
University of Arizona alumni
Native American women writers